Jacques de Casembroot (1903–1988) was a Belgian film director and screenwriter who settled and worked in France. Which much of his work was in the documentary field, he also directed or scripted several feature films.

Selected filmography
 Le perroquet vert (1929)
 The Last Night (1934)
 The Guardian Angel (1942)
 Jericho (1946)
 Third at Heart (1947)
 Mystery in Shanghai (1950)
 Jocelyn (1952)

References

Bibliography
 Rège, Philippe . Encyclopedia of French Film Directors, Volume 1. Scarecrow Press, 2009.

External links

1903 births
1988 deaths
Belgian film directors
French film directors
Belgian emigrants to France
people from Brussels

fr:Jean Joffre